Mokpo National University is located in Muan and Mokpo, South Korea. Mokpo, located in the most southwestern region of Korea, is a key coastal city of the Korean Peninsula. The main campus is located in the valley of Seungdal Mountain, which has a beautiful view of the sea and the surrounding area.

External links

Official website (Korean)
Official website (English)
Official website (Chinese)

Presidents
 1st BAE, Jong-moo | Phd, Literature
 2nd LEE, Tae-geun | Phd, Law
 3rd NO, Jin-young | Phd, Law
 4th KIM, Woong-bae | Phd, Literature
 5th IM, Byoung-sun | Phd, Science
 6th KO, Suk-kyu | Phd, Literature (2010-2014)
 7th CHOI, Il | Phd, Engineering (2014~2018)
 8th PARK, Min-seo | PhD, Social Welfare (2018~present)

Academics

Undergraduate
College of Pharmacy
Department of Pharmacy
College of Education
Department of Education
Department of Ethics Education
Department of English Education
Department of Mathematics Education
Department of Environmental Education
College of Humanities
Department of Korean Language & Literature
Department of English Language & Literature
Department of Chinese Language & Literature
Department of Japanese Language & Literature
Department of German Language & Literature
Department of History
Department of Archeology
Department of Cultural Anthropology
College of Social Sciences
Department of Urban & Regional Development
Department of Law
Department of Politics & Public Administration
Department of Land Administration
Department of Politics & Media
Department of Social Welfare
College of Natural Sciences
Department of Physics
Department of Chemistry
Department of Biotechnology
Department of Horticultural Science
Department of Marine & Fisheries Resources
Department of Medicinal Plant Resources
Department of Nursing
College of Engineering
Department of Mechanical Engineering
Department of Food Engineering
Department of Information & Electronics Engineering
Department of Computer Engineering
Department of Architectural Engineering
Department of Electric Engineering
Department of Civil Engineering
Department of Environmental Engineering
Department of Advanced Materials Engineering
Department of Naval Architecture
Department of Information & Communications
Department of Control System Engineering
Department of Multimedia Engineering
Department of Landscape Architecture
Department of Information Security Engineering
Department of Architecture
Department of Ocean engineering
College of Business Administration
Department of Business Administration
Department of Economics
Department of International Trade
Department of Finance & Insurance
Department of Tourism Management
Department of Electric Commerce
College of Human Ecology, Music & Fine Arts & Physical Education
Department of Child Studies
Department of Food & Nutrition
Department of Clothing & Textiles
Department of Music
Department of Fine Arts
Department of Physical Education

Graduate school 
Graduate School
Graduate School of Education
Graduate School of Business Administration & Public Administration
Graduate School of Industrial Technology

International partners 

Argentina
National University of Lanús
Australia
Deakin University
Griffith University
Murdoch University
Azerbaijan
Azerbaijan Medical University
Canada
International Language Academy of Canada
Sprott Shaw College
 University of Alberta
University of Victoria
China
Beiyang Vocational & Technical School, Weihai (威海北洋职业技术学校)
Guangxi Normal University (广西师范大学)
Hangzhou Normal University (杭州师范大学)
Harbin Engineering University (哈尔滨工程大学)
Huawei Korean Professional School, Qingdao (青岛华威留学预科专修学校)
Institute of International Business & Economics, Shandong Academy of Social Science (山东社会科学院对外经济研究所)
Northeastern University (Shenyang, China) (东北大学)
Ocean University of China (中国海洋大学)
School of Economics, Qingdao University (青岛大学经济学院)
Shanghai International Studies University (上海外国语大学)
Shanghai University (上海大学)
Shenzhen University (深圳大学)
Sichuan University (四川大学)
Tianjin University of Science & Technology (天津科技大学)
Xiamen University (厦门大学)
Yanbian University (延边大学)
Yantai University (烟台大学)
Yunnan Nationalities University (云南民族大学)
Yanbian University of Science and Technology (延边科技大学)
Zhejiang Sci-Tech University (浙江理工大学)
Zhejiang Shuren University (浙江树人大学)
Zhengzhou University (郑州大学)
Fiji
University of the South Pacific
France
The Center for the Research & Application of Earth Architecture, The School of Architecture of Grenoble
University of Strasbourg
Germany
Saarland University
Technische Fachhochschule Berlin
University of Bochum
University of Bonn
University of Leipzig
Hong Kong
School of Continuing and Professional Studies, The Chinese University of Hong Kong (香港中文大學專業進修學院)
Indonesia
Institut Teknologi Sepuluh November (ITS), Surabaya
Universitas Teknologi Sumbawa (UTS), Sumbawa Island
Lombok Institute of Technology (LIT), Lombok Island
University of Solo (UoS), Surakarta Special Region 
Japan
Aichi Shukutoku University (愛知淑徳大学)
Daito Bunka University (大東文化大学)
Gifu University (岐阜大学)
Kobe University (神戸大学)
Nagoya University (名古屋大学)
Saga University (佐賀大学)
Shimonoseki City University (下関市立大学)
Kazakhstan
Almaty Abay State University
Laos
National University of Laos
Malaysia
Universiti Tunku Abdul Rahman (拉曼大学)
Mongolia
University of the Humanities
Peru
National University of Engineering
Philippines
University of the Philippines System
Russia
Krasnoyarsk State Pedagogical University
Spain
University of Las Palmas de Gran Canaria
Taiwan
Feng Chia University (逢甲大學)
National Taiwan Ocean University (國立臺灣海洋大學)
Tatung University(大同大學)
Thailand
King Mongkut's Institute of Technology
United States
Augsburg University
California State University, Sacramento
Clemson University
University of California, Riverside
University of Missouri-Kansas City
University of Nebraska-Lincoln
University of Southern Mississippi
Vietnam
National Economics University

See also
List of national universities in South Korea
List of universities and colleges in South Korea
Education in Korea

References 

Mokpo
National universities and colleges in South Korea
Universities and colleges in South Jeolla Province
Educational institutions established in 1946
1946 establishments in Korea